Paramasivan  is a 2006 Indian Tamil-language action film directed by P. Vasu and produced by S. Ramesh Babu. Ajith Kumar, Laila, Jayaram, Vivek, Prakash Raj playing lead character roles. It was released on 14 January 2006 to widespread negative reviews and had an above average run at the box-office. The film was a complete remake of the Hindi-language film Kartoos (1999) starring Sanjay Dutt, Jackie Shroff and Manisha Koirala.

Plot
Subramaniyam Siva is in jail, awaiting the death sentence for killing corrupt and evil members of the police force who had killed his father SI Ganapathy and sister. SP of Police 'Nethiadi' Nandakumar is an honest, fearless police officer who has been given the mission to flush out the terrorist outfit behind the Coimbatore blasts. He decides to employ unconventional methods to fulfill his mission and engages Siva to assist him, renaming him Paramasivan, changing his look (cutting his Jaṭā hair), and giving him a single-point agenda – trace out and erase the people responsible for the Coimbatore blasts. Unaware to Paramasivan, Nandakumar intends on killing him after the mission is completed.

The fly in the ointment is played by CBI officer Nair, who is out to trace Paramasivan and stop his unlawful activities. His assistant SI Agniputran, provides lighter moments. How Paramasivan finishes the villains and his job forms the rest of the story. Paramasivan learns of Nandakumar's idea to kill him after the mission during the last few scenes where Nair intervenes. Eventually, Paramasivan is forgiven and starts a new life with his lover Malar.

Cast

 Ajith Kumar as Subramaniyam Siva (Paramasivan)
 Laila as Malar
 Jayaram as CBI officer V. Ayyappan Nair
 Vivek as SI Agniputran
 Prakash Raj as SP 'Nethiadi' Nandakumar
 Nassar as Vetrivel, police
 Avinash as DGP Rajasekar
 Naveen as Farlow the terrorist
 Kota Srinivasa Rao as Swamy Kathirvethi
 Rajesh as SI Ganapathy, Subramaniyam Siva's father
 Seetha as Subramaniyam Siva's mother
 Santhana Bharathi as Malar's father
 Aishwarya as Malar's stepmother
 KPAC Lalitha as Malar's grandmother
 Mayilsamy as Police Inspector
 Sathyan as Police
 R. S. Shivaji as Police
 Cell Murugan as Sandeep Munusamy
 Ragasya in an item number

Production
After the success of Chandramukhi (2005), director P. Vasu announced his intentions of directing Rajinikanth again but the announcement of Rajinikanth's collaboration with Shankar in Sivaji hindered his hopes. In August 2005, he roped in Ajith Kumar to play the protagonist in his next film. The project was initially taken up by director Bala's production house, B Studios, and was titled Idi (Thunder), with Laila selected to play the leading female role. The film was launched on 10 September 2005 by Rajinikanth, while the title was changed to Paramasivan.

Following Ajith Kumar's exit from Bala's directorial venture, Naan Kadavul, this film changed producers the next month with S. Ramesh Babu agreeing to finance the film. Nisha Kothari was first requested to appear in an item number in the film but the role was later taken by Ragasya. For the film, Ajith lost 15 kg to get into shape. K. Balachandar's Kavithalaya Productions took up the distribution of Paramasivan for the Chengalpet area.

Soundtrack

Background score and Songs composed by Vidyasagar

Release
The film was released on 14 January 2006 on the eve of pongal along with Vijay's Aathi and Simbu's Saravana. Paramasivan ran for only 100 days. Upon release, the film received a widespread mixed reviews from the critics. The film was declared as above average at the box office. The satellite rights of the film were solds to Jaya TV. It was dubbed into Hindi as Godfather Shiva.

See also

 List of action films of the 2000s
 List of Tamil films of 2006

References

External links
 
 

2006 action thriller films
2006 films
Tamil remakes of Hindi films
Indian action thriller films
Films directed by P. Vasu
2000s Tamil-language films
Films scored by Vidyasagar
Fictional portrayals of the Tamil Nadu Police